Germany has participated in the Eurovision Young Dancers 13 times since its debut in 1985. Germany has hosted the contest once, in 1987. Before German reunification in 1990, it was presented as West Germany, representing the Federal Republic of Germany. East Germany (the German Democratic Republic) did not compete.

Participation overview

Hostings

See also
Germany in the Eurovision Song Contest
Germany in the Eurovision Dance Contest
Germany in the Eurovision Young Musicians
Germany in the Junior Eurovision Song Contest

External links 
 Eurovision Young Dancers

Countries in the Eurovision Young Dancers